Anjirebus-e Sofla (also Romanized as Anjīrebūs-e Soflá; also known as Anjīrbājsī, Anjīrebūs, and Anjīrebūs-e Bālā) is a village in Dasht-e Hor Rural District, in the Central District of Salas-e Babajani County, Kermanshah Province, Iran. At the 2006 census, its population was 63, in 12 families.

References 

Populated places in Salas-e Babajani County